Based in Paris, France, Betjeman & Barton have been tea merchants since 1919.  They offer black, perfumed, and herbal teas from around the world.

History 
The company was founded by Frenchmen Betjeman and his British employee Barton. , the company sells over two hundred and fifty varieties of tea.

References

External links 

 

Tea companies of France
Tea brands
Shops in Paris
French brands